Quee is the surname of the following notable people:
Choo Seng Quee (1914–1983), Singaporean football player
Chung Keng Quee (1821–1901), Malaysian businessman
Kwame Quee (born 1996), Sierra Leonean football midfielder 
Richard Chee Quee (born 1971), Australian first-class cricketer
Seah Jim Quee, Malaysian landowner
William Quee (1877–1920), New Zealand cricketer